Trachy  is a village in the administrative district of Gmina Sośnicowice, within Gliwice County, Silesian Voivodeship, in southern Poland.

The village has a population of 791.

References

Trachy